Sadovoe is a village in the municipality of Bălți in the north of Moldova. It has an area of 9.81 km², and had a population of 1,369 at the 2004 Moldovan Census. From Bălți to Sadovoe is around 11km.

References

Villages of Bălți Municipality